Gianpaolo Venuta (also known as Gian Paolo Venuta or Gian-Paolo Venuta; born 30 August 1978) is a Canadian actor.

Filmography

Film
Take-out (2001) as Rory
Vampire High (2001) as Damon Grismer
Abandon (2002) as Research Assistant
The Circle (2002) as Jetson Harlow
Silent Night (2002) as Chris
Il Duce canadese (2004) as Mario Alvaro
Fries with That? (2004) as Tommy Maguire aka Tigerman
Noel (2004) as Young Guy
Time Bomb (2006) as Agent Brian Goodman
Last Exit (2006) as James Moore
My Claudia (2009) as Matthew (also writer and director)
Plateau Baby Man (2009) as Kelly
Let the Game Begin (2010) as Frat Boy
Score: A Hockey Musical (2010) as Marco
Joy Ride 3: Roadkill (2014) as Austin

Television
Live Through This (2000) as Kyle (2 Episodes)
Undressed (2002) as Dominick
Bliss (2003) as Luc Gibson
Korea: The Unfinished War (2003) as Don Gill
Petits mythes urbains (2004) as Colleague
Pure (2005) as Josh
Naked Josh (2006) as Nick (11 Episodes)
Like Mother, Like Daughter (2007) as Keith
The Double Life of Eleanor Kendall (2008) as Barkeep
Second Chances (2010) as Neil Bray/Phil Sterin
Blue Bloods (2010) as Jared
Being Human (2011) as Danny (recurring role)
The Firm (2012) as Joey Morolto Jr
Time of Death (2013) as Eliot Larken
Good Witch (2019) as Vincent (5 episodes)

Voiceovers
Station X (2005) as Knob (voice)
Assassin's Creed II (2009) as Ludovico Orsi (voice)
Assassin's Creed: Brotherhood (2010) as Fabio Orsini (voice)
Far Cry 3 (2012) as Jason Brody (voice and mo-cap)
Far Cry 6 (2021) as Jason Brody (voice and mo-cap)

External links 

 Gianpaolo Venuta at GianPaoloVenuta.com, Official Website

Further reading
 Bento, Stephanie. "Dorval resident plays lead in thriller." The Chronicle [Montreal] 31 January 2007. Web. 12 March 2012.

Living people
Canadian male film actors
Canadian male television actors
Canadian male video game actors
Place of birth missing (living people)
Canadian male voice actors
Canadian people of Sicilian descent
1978 births